Denis Maher (born 9 July 1991) is an Irish hurler.  He plays hurling with his local club Thurles Sarsfields and with the Tipperary senior inter-county team since 2014.

He played Minor Hurling for Tipperary in 2008 and 2009 and was a member of the Under-21 team in 2010, 2011 and 2012 winning a Munster and all Ireland final in 2010.

In February 2014, Maher scored 2-2 against Clare in the 2014 Waterford Crystal Cup final as Tipperary won by 14 points.

Maher made his championship debut for Tipperary on 1 June 2014 in the Munster Championship against Limerick, coming on in the 62nd minute and scoring a point in a 2-18 to 2-16 defeat.

Honours

Thurles Sarsfields
Tipperary Senior Hurling Championship (7):2009, 2010, 2012, 2014, 2015, 2016, 2017
Munster Senior Club Hurling Championship (1): 2012

Tipperary
Munster Under-21 Hurling Championship
Runners Up (2): 2012 
2014 Waterford Crystal Cup

References

External links
Tipperary GAA Player Profile

Tipperary inter-county hurlers
Thurles Sarsfields hurlers
Living people
1991 births